The 1974 AIAW women's basketball tournament was held on March 20–23, 1974.  The host site was Kansas State University in Manhattan, Kansas.

Sixteen teams participated, and Immaculata University was crowned national champion at the conclusion of the tournament for the third straight year.

Tournament bracket

Main bracket

Consolation bracket

References

AIAW women's basketball tournament
AIAW
AIAW National Division I Basketball Championship
1974 in sports in Kansas
Women's sports in Kansas